Oroplema is a genus of moths in the family Uraniidae. The genus was erected by Jeremy Daniel Holloway in 1998.

Species
Oroplema dealbata (Warren, 1906)
Oroplema oyamana (Matsumura, 1931)
Oroplema simplex (Warren, 1899)
Oroplema parvipallida Holloway, 1998
Oroplema plagifera (Butler, 1881)

References

Uraniidae